Critchley (also spelled Chritchley) is an Anglo-Saxon surname. Notable people with the surname include:

Alexander Critchley (1893–1974), English politician and Conservative MP for Liverpool Edge Hill
Alfred Cecil Critchley (1890–1963), Canadian-English entrepreneur and national politician
Bruce Critchley (born 1942), British sports commentator
Emily Critchley (born 1980), English poet and writer
Hilary Critchley (born before 1978), British academic in the field of reproductive medicine
Jack Critchley (1892–1964), Australian politician
James Sidney Critchley (1865–1944), first works manager and a director of Daimler Motor Company
Jason Critchley (born 1970), Welsh rugby player
Julian Critchley (1930–2000), English national politician, journalist and writer
Laura Critchley English singer-songwriter
MacDonald Critchley (1900–1997), English neurologist
Matt Critchley (born 1996), English cricketer
Morrie Critchley (1850–1910), American baseball pitcher
Neil Critchley (born 1978), English footballer
Oswald Critchley (1864–1935), English-Canadian provincial politician, pioneer and rancher
Pat Critchley, Irish athlete
Ron Critchley, (born 1940), Australian Rules footballer
Simon Critchley (born 1960), English philosopher and academic
Ted Critchley (1903–1996), English footballer
Tom Critchley (1916–2009), Australian diplomat

Surnames of British Isles origin